Cornel Dănuț Frăsineanu (born 20 August 1976, in Caracal) is a retired Romanian football player.
He was also a manager at Atletic Bradu in the Romanian Liga IV.

Honours
Dinamo București
Cupa României: 2002–03
Bursaspor
Turkish Second League: 2005–06

References

External links

1976 births
Living people
People from Caracal, Romania
Romanian footballers
Romania under-21 international footballers
FC U Craiova 1948 players
CS Minerul Motru players
FC Rapid București players
FC Dinamo București players
Bursaspor footballers
FC UTA Arad players
CS Mioveni players
FC Internațional Curtea de Argeș players
ASC Daco-Getica București players
Liga I players
Liga II players
Süper Lig players
TFF First League players
Romanian expatriate footballers
Expatriate footballers in Israel
Romanian expatriate sportspeople in Israel
Expatriate footballers in Turkey
Romanian expatriate sportspeople in Turkey
Association football fullbacks
Romanian football managers